Amar Rahmanović (born 13 May 1994) is a Bosnian professional footballer who plays as a midfielder for Russian club Krylia Sovetov Samara and the Bosnia and Herzegovina national team.

Club career
Born in Tuzla, Rahmanović began his career by playing with local side Sloboda. After two seasons of playing in the Bosnian Premier League, Sloboda got relegated, and in the summer of 2012, he moved to Novi Pazar playing in the Serbian SuperLiga. He made his debut in the SuperLiga against Rad on 24 October 2012. After one season in the Serbian top-flight, Rahmanović returned to Bosnia and Herzegovina and joined Premier League side Olimpic. On 9 December 2015, he signed with Slovenian PrvaLiga club Maribor. On 31 August 2016, Rahmanović moved to another Slovenian club, Celje.

In the summer of 2017, he left Celje and shortly after, on 20 June 2017, signed a two-year contract with another Bosnian Premier League club, Sarajevo. On 20 December 2018, Rahmanović extended his contract with the club until June 2021. He won his first trophy with Sarajevo on 15 May 2019, after Sarajevo beat Široki Brijeg in the final and won the 2018–19 Bosnian Cup. Three days after the cup final, on 18 May 2019, Rahmanović also won the league title with the club after Sarajevo beat Zvijezda 09 4–0 at home. On 1 June 2020, he won his second league title with Sarajevo, though after the 2019–20 Bosnian Premier League season was ended abruptly due to the COVID-19 pandemic in Bosnia and Herzegovina and after which Sarajevo were by default crowned league champions for a second consecutive time.

On 19 January 2021, Rahmanović signed a one-and-a-half-year contract, with an option to renew it for one more year, with Turkish Süper Lig club Konyaspor, for an undisclosed transfer fee. He made his debut for Konyaspor five days later, on 24 January, in a league match against Antalyaspor.

On 7 September 2022, Rahmanović signed a three-year contract with Russian Premier League club Krylia Sovetov Samara.

International career
Rahmanović represented Bosnia and Herzegovina at all youth levels. In the summer of 2013, he was part of the Bosnia and Herzegovina team at the 2013 Mediterranean Games, in which the country finished in fifth place.

In March 2020, Rahmanović received his first senior call-up, for the UEFA Euro 2020 qualifying play-offs against Northern Ireland.

He made his senior international debut in a friendly game against Iran on 12 November 2020.

Career statistics

Club

International

Honours
Koper
Slovenian Cup: 2014–15
Slovenian Supercup: 2015

Maribor
Slovenian Cup: 2015–16

Sarajevo
Bosnian Premier League: 2018–19, 2019–20
Bosnian Cup: 2018–19

References

External links

Amar Rahmanović at Sofascore

1994 births
Living people
Sportspeople from Tuzla
Association football midfielders
Bosnia and Herzegovina footballers
Bosnia and Herzegovina youth international footballers
Bosnia and Herzegovina under-21 international footballers
Bosnia and Herzegovina international footballers
FK Sloboda Tuzla players
FK Novi Pazar players
FK Olimpik players
NK Istra 1961 players
FC Koper players
NK Maribor players
NK Celje players
FK Sarajevo players
Konyaspor footballers
PFC Krylia Sovetov Samara players
Premier League of Bosnia and Herzegovina players
Serbian SuperLiga players
Croatian Football League players
Slovenian PrvaLiga players
Süper Lig players
Russian Premier League players
Competitors at the 2013 Mediterranean Games
Mediterranean Games competitors for Bosnia and Herzegovina
Bosnia and Herzegovina expatriate footballers
Bosnia and Herzegovina expatriate sportspeople in Serbia
Expatriate footballers in Serbia
Bosnia and Herzegovina expatriate sportspeople in Croatia
Expatriate footballers in Croatia
Bosnia and Herzegovina expatriate sportspeople in Slovenia
Expatriate footballers in Slovenia
Bosnia and Herzegovina expatriate sportspeople in Turkey
Expatriate footballers in Turkey
Bosnia and Herzegovina expatriate sportspeople in Russia
Expatriate footballers in Russia